Kashyap Samhitā (Devanagari , also Kashyapa, Kasyap, Kasyapa), also known as Vriddha Jivakiya Tantra is a treatise on Ayurveda attributed to the  sage Kashyap.

The text is often named as one of the earliest treatises on Indian medicine, alongside works like the Sushruta Samhita, Charaka Samhita, Bhela Samhita, and Harita Samhita. It is dependent upon the works of the Ayuvedic practitioner Charaka.

In contemporary practice of Ayurveda, it is often consulted in the fields of Ayuvedic pediatrics, gynecology and obstetrics. It is also part of the Ayurveda teaching syllabus, especially in Kaumarabhritya Balaroga. The treatise was translated into Chinese during the Middle Ages.

The Kashyap Samhita contains 200 chapters.  
 Sutra sthan, of 30 chapters
 Nidan sthan, of 8 chapters
 Vimana sthan, of 8 chapters
 Shareer sthan, of 8 chapters
 Indriya sthan, of 12 chapters,
 Chikitsa sthan, of 30 chapters,
 Siddhi sthan, of 12 chapters
 Kalpa sthan, of 12 chapters
 Khil Bhag, of 80 chapters.

References

Bibliography
 Kashyap-Samhita or Vriddha-JivakiyaTantra 1970. Trans IGM Shastri, Bombay Sastu Sahitya, 757.
 Kashyap Samhita or Vridhajivakiya Tantra; text with English translation and commentary; edited by Prof. (km.) P. V. Tewari with Dr. Neeraj Kumar, Dr. R. D. Sharma and Dr. Abhimanyu Kumar
 Kashyap Samhita, Hindi translation with commentary edited by Nepal Raj Guru Pandita Hemaraja Sharma commentary by Shri Satyapal Bhishagacharya.

External links
 

 Ayurvedic texts
 Ancient Indian medical works
Sanskrit texts